Aphyocypris moltrechti, Moltrecht's minnow, is a species of cyprinid fish endemic to Taiwan.  It was formerly considered to be the only species in the genus Pararasbora. The Endemic Species Research Institute under the Council of Agriculture of the Executive Yuan in Taiwan has enlisted  Aphyocypris moltrechti as “precious and rare species” among other endemic freshwater species.

Named in honor of physician-entomologist Arnold Moltrecht (1873-1952), who collected the type specimen.

Aphyocypris moltrechti is distributed in the middle portion of western Taiwan, where they can be found in Tachia River and Tatu River. Their total body length are usually seen from 4 cm to 8 cm.

References

Cyprinid fish of Asia
Endemic fauna of Taiwan
Freshwater fish of Taiwan
Taxa named by Charles Tate Regan
Fish described in 1908